Russ Farwell (born April 20, 1956 in Peace River, Alberta) is the owner, governor, and general manager of the Seattle Thunderbirds of the Western Hockey League. He is most well known for his stint as general manager of the Philadelphia Flyers from 1990 to 1994, during which he made a blockbuster trade with the Quebec Nordiques to acquire the rights to Eric Lindros in a package including two draft picks and several players, notably Hockey Hall of Fame center Peter Forsberg. However, the Flyers did not qualify for the playoffs during any year Farwell was general manager and had a losing record of 136 wins, 150 losses, and 42 ties. He played one junior A hockey game for the Pass Red Devils scoring zero points and two penalty minutes.

References

External links

Flyers Consider Farwell (6/6/1990)
Seattle Thunderbirds profile

1956 births
Living people
Ice hockey people from Alberta
National Hockey League executives
People from Northern Sunrise County
Philadelphia Flyers executives
Philadelphia Flyers scouts
Seattle Thunderbirds coaches